The 1959 Honduran Amateur League was the twelfth edition of the Honduran Amateur League. C.D. Olimpia obtained its 3rd national title.  The season ran from 1 February 1959 to 16 November 1959.

Regional champions

Known results

National championship round
Played in a double round-robin format between the regional champions.  Also known as the Triangular.

Known results

Olimpia's lineup

References

Liga Amateur de Honduras seasons
Honduras
1959 in Honduras